Carlos Lavezzari Rivera (September 18, 1911 – July 27, 2003) was a Puerto Rican infielder in the Negro leagues between 1939 and 1944.

A native of Santurce, Puerto Rico, Rivera made his Negro leagues debut in 1939 with the Baltimore Elite Giants. He went on to play for the New York Cubans and New York Black Yankees. Rivera died in New York, New York in 2003 at age 91.

References

External links
 and Seamheads
 Carlos 'Charlie' Rivera at Negro League Baseball Players Association

1911 births
2003 deaths
Baltimore Elite Giants players
New York Black Yankees players
New York Cubans players
People from Santurce, Puerto Rico
Puerto Rican baseball players
Baseball infielders